Scythris bagdadiella is a moth of the family Scythrididae. It was described by Hans Georg Amsel in 1949. It is found in Russia (southern Ural), Algeria, Turkey, Iraq, Afghanistan and Uzbekistan.

The larvae feed on Tamarix species.

References

bagdadiella
Moths described in 1949
Moths of the Middle East
Moths of Asia